San Patricio County is located in the U.S. state of Texas.  As of the 2020 census, its population was 68,755. Its county seat is Sinton. San Patricio County is part of the Corpus Christi metropolitan statistical area.

History

In 1828, 200 Irish Catholic families, recruited from Ireland and the Irish population of New York City, contracted with the Mexican government to settle on 80 leagues of land in this area. By 1836, about 500 people lived in the colony on 84 Mexican land grants. During the Texas Revolution, most fled from the colony because of fighting in the area. By 1841, a small number of permanent residents had returned. When Texas was annexed by the United States in 1845, the area was stabilized by the presence of U.S. troops under General Zachary Taylor. In 1845, the county was formed (San Patricio is Spanish for Saint Patrick, the primary patron saint of the colonists' home country of Ireland), and Corpus Christi was designated as the county seat. The following year, the county south of the Nueces River was reorganized as Nueces County, and San Patricio became its county seat. In 1848, additional counties were formed out of San Patricio, which further reduced its size.

The 1850 U.S. Census listed only 200 people in the county, including three slaves. The local economy was based on cattle raising. In the mid-1860s, more settlers moved, drawn by the cheap land. By 1870, 602 people lived in the county, and the agricultural census reported 51 farms and ranches, totaling , in the area, with about  described as "improved". Development of the county intensified during the early 20th century, as hundreds of farmers moved in from North Texas and other states. The population reached 7,307 by 1910, and was 11,386 by 1920; 470 farms were counted in 1910, and 757 farms in 1920. Cattle ranching remained important, but vegetables and cotton also became important.

Geography

The Gulf of Mexico forms the eastern border of the county.

Major highways
  Interstate 37
  U.S. Highway 77
  Interstate 69E is currently under construction and will follow the current route of U.S. 77 in most places.
  U.S. Highway 181
  State Highway 35
  State Highway 188
  State Highway 359
  State Highway 361
  Farm to Market Road 136

Adjacent counties
 Bee County (north)
 Refugio County (north)
 Aransas County (northeast)
 Nueces County (south)
 Jim Wells County (southwest)
 Live Oak County (northwest)

Demographics

As of the 2020 United States census, there were 68,755 people, 23,422 households, and 16,838 families residing in the county.

As of the census of 2000, 67,138 people, 22,093 households, and 17,232 families resided in the county.  The population density was 97 people/sq mi (37/km2).  The 24,864 housing units averaged 36/sq mi (14/km2).  The racial makeup of the county was 76.76% White, 2.81%  African American, 0.70% Native American, 0.63% Asian, 0.11% Pacific Islander, 15.94% from other races, and 3.05% from two or more races. About 49.42% of the population was Hispanic or Latino of any race.

Of the 22,093 households, 41.6% had children under the age of 18 living with them, 60.6% were married couples living together, 12.7% had a female householder with no husband present, and 22.0% were not families. About 18.7% of all households were made up of individuals, and 8.0% had someone living alone who was 65 or older.  The average household size was 2.97, and the average family size was 3.40.

In the county, the age distribution was 31.1% under the age of 18, 10.0% from 18 to 24, 28.2% from 25 to 44, 20.2% from 45 to 64, and 10.5% who were 65 or older.  The median age was 32 years. For every 100 females, there were 100.50 males.  For every 100 females age 18 and over, there were 98.30 males.

The median income for a household in the county was $34,836, and for a family was $40,002. Males had a median income of $31,132 versus $20,730 for females. The per capita income for the county was $15,425.  About 14.60% of families and 18.00% of the population were below the poverty line, including 23.50% of those under age 18 and 16.80% of those age 65 or over.

Communities

Cities (multiple counties)
 Aransas Pass (partly in Aransas and Nueces Counties)
 Corpus Christi (mostly in Nueces County, with small parts in Kleberg and Aransas Counties)
 Ingleside (small part in Nueces County)
 Portland (small part in Nueces County)
 San Patricio (small part in Nueces County)

Cities

 Gregory
 Ingleside on the Bay
 Mathis
 Odem
 Sinton (county seat)
 Taft

Towns
 Lake City
 Lakeside

Census-designated places

 Country Acres
 Del Sol
 Doyle (former)
 Edgewater Estates
 Edroy
 Falman
 La Paloma Addition
 Lakeshore Gardens-Hidden Acres
 Loma Linda
 Morgan Farm
 Paisano Park
 Rancho Chico
 St. Paul
 Taft Southwest
 Tradewinds

Unincorporated community 
 Sodville

Education
School districts include:
 Aransas Pass Independent School District
 Gregory-Portland Independent School District
 Ingleside Independent School District
 Mathis Independent School District
 Odem-Edroy Independent School District
 Sinton Independent School District
 Taft Independent School District

Del Mar College is the designated community college for all of San Patricio County.

Politics
Despite being majority-minority  San Patricio county leans overwhelmingly Republican. The GOP does better than average among Latino residents in Texas, particularly south Texas. In 2022, Republicans won 40% of the Latino vote.This has been as high as 48% in 2014. These margins help Republicans win majority-minority districts, while Republicans in other parts of the country struggle - only garnering between 21% and 30% of the vote. Republicans appear to be increasing their Latino support from picking off specific segments: Men, rural Latinos, Rio Grande Valley, devout Catholics,Tejano and pro-life voters.

See also

 Port of Corpus Christi
 National Register of Historic Places listings in San Patricio County, Texas
 Recorded Texas Historic Landmarks in San Patricio County

References

External links

 San Patricio County government's website
 
 Historic San Patricio County materials, hosted by the Portal to Texas History.
 "San Patricio County Profile" from the Texas Association of Counties 

 
1836 establishments in the Republic of Texas
Populated places established in 1836
Irish-American history and culture in Texas
Hurricane Ike